Geothermobacter is a thermophilic genus of bacteria from the order Desulfuromonadales with one known species (Geothermobacter ehrlichii).

References

External links
 Geothermobacter ehrlichii microbewiki

 

Desulfuromonadales
Bacteria genera
Monotypic bacteria genera